The 2023 Jacksonville mayoral election will be held on March 21, 2023, with a runoff on May 16 if necessary. Incumbent Republican mayor Lenny Curry is term-limited and cannot seek reelection to a third term in office. Seven candidates filed to run, including four Republicans, two Democrats, and an independent. Jacksonville mayoral elections use a blanket primary system where all candidates, regardless of party affiliation, appear on the same ballot.

Background
Jacksonville has been the most populous city in the United States with a Republican mayor since Democrats flipped the mayorship of San Diego, California in 2020. Republicans have held the mayorship of Jacksonville continuously since 1993 with the exception of one four-year period when Democrat Alvin Brown served as mayor following his upset victory in the 2011 election. However, the consolidated city-county of Jacksonville and Duval County has historically been more Democratic-leaning than other counties in the state. In 2018, the Democratic nominees for governor and U.S. Senate both narrowly carried Jacksonville even as they lost statewide; in 2022, although the city voted for the Republican nominee in the gubernatorial and Senate contests, it still voted to the left of the state as a whole.

Campaign
The two leading Republicans are backed by different factions of the business community; Daniel Davis has aligned himself with the network of developers, CEOs, and elected officials who backed Lenny Curry and who traditionally hold great influence over city elections, while LeAnna Cumber is backed by a more conservative group of outsiders. Florida Politics commented that Cumber had the support of "various anti-Lenny Curry Republicans" in local government. Al Ferraro is considered to have the most conservative platform of any candidate, though he lacks the fundraising or endorsements to compete with Cumber and Davis. Cumber has heavily criticized Curry's effort to raise the Jacksonville gas tax, while Davis has avoided taking positions on specific city issues and instead makes broad appeals for unity.

The campaign between Cumber and Davis has been heated, with Davis running ads labeling Cumber a "fake conservative" because she donated to Democratic politicians in the past and Cumber running ads claiming that Davis "voted to make it easier for criminals to cover up sexual assaults against children," criticizing him for voting to let DACA recipients get driver's licenses, and accusing him of contributing to rising crime rates in Jacksonville. Both candidates also ran ads accusing each other of supporting the privatization of JEA, the city's publicly-owned electric utility, though they each denied that they would sell it if elected mayor. In February 2023, the city council began investigating ties between Cumber's husband and a company that attempted to buy JEA. Cumber claimed the probe was orchestrated by allies of Davis to help him win the mayoral election.

In comparison, the two Democrats have largely avoided criticizing each other and are both running on their own strengths, with Deegan running a positive ad on her life story. Audrey Gibson is a longtime fixture of Jacksonville politics and had a reputation for working across the aisle during her time in the state legislature. Additionally, she is considered to have an advantage because 55% of registered Democrats in Jacksonville are black and she has a history of performing well in heavily African-American areas. However, Donna Deegan has a great deal of name recognition from her time as a television journalist and the frequent public appearances she has made during her mayoral bid. She has prioritized small donors and was the only candidate to qualify for the ballot via petition rather than paying a fee. Deegan has raised significantly more than Gibson, though her fundraising is still considered lackluster in comparison to Cumber and Davis.

Candidates

Republican Party

Declared
LeAnna Cumber, city councilor
Daniel Davis, president of the Jacksonville Chamber of Commerce, former state representative, and former president of the Jacksonville City Council
Al Ferraro, city councilor
Frank Keasler, consultant

Withdrew
Matt Carlucci, at-large city councilor

Declined 
Ron Salem, at-large city councilor

Democratic Party

Declared
Donna Deegan, breast cancer nonprofit founder, former First Coast News anchor, cousin of former mayor Tommy Hazouri, and nominee for Florida's 4th congressional district in 2020
Audrey Gibson, former Minority Leader of the Florida Senate

Did not qualify
Theresa Richardson

Declined
Brenda Priestly Jackson, city councilor (running for an at-large council seat)
Kimberly Daniels, state representative and former city councilor

Independents

Declared
Omega Allen, former chair of the Northwest Jacksonville Economic Development Trust Fund Advisory Committee and candidate for mayor in 2015 and 2019

Did not qualify
Darcy Richardson, businessman, Reform nominee for Governor of Florida in 2018, and Alliance nominee for vice president in 2020

Fundraising
As of December, Cumber and Davis held a wide lead in fundraising; Davis led with $4.5 million on hand while Cumber had $2.8 million. Al Ferraro lagged behind with $240,000. Among the Democrats, Donna Deegan had the most cash on hand with $590,000, while Audrey Gibson followed with $250,000.

Endorsements
In March 2023, flyers were distributed at polling places in northwest Jacksonville that listed candidates purportedly endorsed by former U.S. Representative Corrine Brown in the Jacksonville primary elections. The flyer recommended a Democratic candidate in every race except the mayoral race, where it recommended Republican LeAnna Cumber. Brown, a Democrat, claimed the flyers were fake and said that she had not endorsed any candidates yet, though she said there were "very qualified Democrats in the race for Mayor."

Polling

Donna Deegan vs. LeAnna Cumber

Donna Deegan vs. Daniel Davis

Donna Deegan vs. Al Ferraro

Results

Notes 

Partisan clients

References

External links 
Official campaign websites
 LeAnna Cumber (R) for Mayor
 Donna Deegan (D) for Mayor
 Al Ferraro (R) for Mayor
 Audrey Gibson (D) for Mayor
 Frank Keasler (R) for Mayor
 Omega Allen (I) for Mayor
 Daniel Davis (R) for Mayor

2023
2023 United States mayoral elections
2023 Florida elections